Petru Groza (7 December 1884 – 7 January 1958) was an Austro-Hungarian-born Romanian politician, best known as the first Prime Minister of the Communist Party-dominated government under Soviet occupation during the early stages of the Communist regime in Romania, and later as the President of the Presidium of the Great National Assembly (nominal head of state of Romania) from 1952 until his death in 1958.

Groza emerged as a public figure at the end of World War I as a notable member of the Romanian National Party (PNR), preeminent layman of the Romanian Orthodox Church, and then member of the Directory Council of Transylvania. In 1925–26 he served as Minister of State in the cabinet of Marshal Alexandru Averescu. In 1933, Groza founded a left-wing Agrarian organization known as the Ploughmen's Front (Frontul Plugarilor). The left-wing ideas he supported earned him the nickname The Red Bourgeois.

Groza became Premier in 1945 when Nicolae Rădescu, a leading Romanian Army general who assumed power briefly following the conclusion of World War II, was forced to resign by the Soviet Union's deputy People's Commissar for Foreign Affairs, Andrei Y. Vishinsky. During Groza's tenure, Romania's King, Michael I, was forced to abdicate as the nation officially became a "People's Republic". Although his authority and power as Premier was compromised by his reliance upon the Soviet Union for support, Groza presided over the onset of full-fledged Communist rule in Romania before eventually being succeeded by Gheorghe Gheorghiu-Dej in 1952 and became the President of the Presidium of the Great National Assembly until his death in 1958.

Early life and career
Born as one of the three sons of a wealthy couple in Bácsi (now called Băcia), a village near Déva (today Deva) in Transylvania (part of Austria-Hungary at the time), his father Adam was a priest. Groza was afforded a variety of opportunities in his youth and early career to establish connections and a degree of notoriety, which would later prove essential in his political career. He attended primary school in his native village, then in Kastély (now Coștei) and Lugos (now Lugoj) in the Banat. In 1903, he graduated from the Hungarian Reformed high school (now the Aurel Vlaicu High School) in Szászváros (now Orăștie). That autumn, he began his law and economics training in Hungary, studying at the University of Budapest. In 1905, he took courses at the University of Berlin, heading to Leipzig University in 1906. He obtained a doctorate from the latter institution in 1907.

After completing his studies, Groza returned to Déva to work as a lawyer. During World War I he served as a soldier in the 8th Honvéd Regiment. In 1918, at the war's end, he emerged on the political scene as a member of the Romanian National Party (PNR) and obtained a position on the Directory Council of Transylvania, convened by ethnic Romanian politicians who had voted in favour of union with Romania; he maintained his office over the course of the following two years.

Throughout this period of his life, Groza established a variety of political connections, working in various Transylvanian political and religious organizations. From 1919 to 1927, for example, Groza obtained a position as a deputy in Synod and Congress of the Romanian Orthodox Church. In the mid-1920s, Groza, who had left the PNR after a conflict with Iuliu Maniu and had joined the People's Party, served as the Minister for Transylvania and Minister of Public Works and Communications in the Third Averescu cabinet.

During this period in his life, Groza was able to amass a personal fortune as a wealthy landowner and establish a notable reputation as a prominent layman within the Romanian Orthodox Church, a position which would later make him invaluable to a Romanian Communist Party (PCR) that was campaigning to attract the support of Eastern Orthodox Christians who constituted the nation's most numerous religious group in 1945.

Rise to power

Despite having briefly retired from public life in 1928 after holding a series of political posts, Groza reemerged on the political scene in 1933, founding a peasant-based political organization, the Ploughmen's Front.

Although the movement originally began in order to oppose the increasing burden of debt carried by Romania's peasants during the Great Depression in Romania and because the National Peasants' Party could not help the poorest peasants, by 1944 the organization was essentially under Communist control. The Communist Party wished to seize power but was too weak to seize it alone – post-communist historiography would later claim that in 1944 it had only about a thousand members. Accordingly, the Romanian communist leaders decided to create a broad coalition of political organizations.

This coalition was composed of four major front organizations: the Romanian Society for Friendship with the Soviet Union, the Union of Patriots, the Patriotic Defense, and, by far the most widely backed by the Romanian populace, Groza's Ploughmen's Front. Being a chief political actor in the largest of the Communist front organizations, Groza was able to assert himself in a position of eminence within the Romanian political sphere as the Ploughmen's Front joined the Communist Party to create the National Democratic Front in October 1944 (it also included the Social Democrats, Mihai Ralea's Socialist Peasants' Party and the Hungarian People's Union, as well as other minor groups). He was first considered by the Communist Lucrețiu Pătrășcanu for the post of Premier in October 1944.

Groza's prominent status within the National Democratic Front afforded him the opportunity to succeed General Nicolae Rădescu as premier when, in January 1945, top Romanian communist leaders, namely Ana Pauker and Gheorghe Gheorghiu-Dej rebuked Rădescu with allegedly failing to combat "fascist sympathizers". With the help of Soviet authorities, the Communists soon mobilized workers to hold a series of demonstrations against Rădescu, and by February many had died because the demonstrations often led to violence. While the communists claimed that the Romanian Army was responsible for the deaths of innocent civilians, Rădescu weakened his own popular support by stating that the communists were "godless foreigners with no homeland". In response, Andrei Y. Vishinsky, the Soviet vice commissar of foreign affairs, traveled to Bucharest and allegedly gave King Michael an ultimatum—unless he sacked Rădescu and replaced him with Groza, Romania's independence would be at risk. 
The king had hoped that General Gheorghe Avramescu, who commanded the Romanian 4th Army in the fight to liberate Transylvania and Hungary, would be designated the next prime minister, but, while Michael was waiting on 2 March for Avramescu to return from the front to Bucharest, the NKVD arrested Avramescu in Slovakia, and he died the next day. Faced with mounting Soviet pressure, Michael complied, and Groza became prime minister on 6 March 1945.

The Groza cabinets

Groza gave key portfolios such as defence, justice, and the interior to the Communists. It nominally included ministers from the National Liberals and National Peasants as well, but the ministers using those labels were fellow travellers like Groza, and had been handpicked by the Communists.

Despite the annoyance of the two powers, the Communists constituted only a minority in Groza's cabinet. The leading figures in the Romanian Communist Party, Pauker and Gheorghiu-Dej, wanted the Groza government to preserve the façade of a coalition government and thus enable the Communists to win the confidence of the masses, since right after the Second World War the communists enjoyed very little political support. For this reason top communist figures like Pauker and Gheorghiu-Dej did not join Groza's cabinet. They planned to gradually impose an out-and-out Communist regime under the veil of the existing coalition government.  By conflating the successes of the regime with their Party, Pauker and Gheorghiu-Dej hoped to win support for the party and lay the foundations for a one-party state. Accordingly, Groza maintained the illusion of a coalition government, appointing members of diverse political organizations to his cabinet and formulating his government's short-term goals in broad, non-ideological terms. He stated at a cabinet meeting on 7 March 1945, for example, that the government sought to guarantee safety and order for the population, implement desired land reform policies, and focus on a "swift cleanup" of the state bureaucracy and immediate prosecution of war criminals, i.e., officials of the Fascist wartime regime of Marshal Ion Antonescu (see Romania during World War II and Romanian People's Tribunals).

To confirm Groza in office, elections were held on 19 November 1946. The count was rigged in order to give an overwhelming majority to the Bloc of Democratic Parties, a Communist-dominated front that included the Ploughmen's Front. Years later, historian Petre Țurlea reviewed a confidential Communist Party report about the election that showed the BPD had, at most, won 47 percent of the vote.  He concluded that had the election been conducted honestly, the opposition parties would have won enough votes between them to form a coalition government—albeit with far less than the 80 percent support long claimed by opposition supporters.

In the mind of the Groza government, the 1946 election confirmed it in office. This claim was made in the face of protests by the United States and the United Kingdom who held that, pursuant to the agreements reached at the Yalta Conference in 1945, only "interim governmental authorities broadly representative of the population", should be supported by the major powers. As a result, Groza's government was permanently estranged from the United States and Great Britain, who nominally supported the waning influence of the monarchist forces under King Michael I.

As Prime Minister

Within days of becoming premier, Groza delivered his first major success. On 10 March 1945, the Soviet Union agreed to return to Romania Northern Transylvania, a territory of over  that had been assigned to Hungary through the 1940 Second Vienna Award sponsored by Germany and Italy. Groza promised that the rights of each ethnic group within the restored territory would be protected (mainly, as a reference to the Hungarian minority in Romania), while Joseph Stalin declared that the previous government under Rădescu had permitted such a large degree of sabotage and terrorism in the region that it would have been impossible to deliver the territory to the Romanians. As a result, only after Groza's guarantee of ethnic minority rights did the Soviet government decide to satisfy the petition of the Romanian government. The recovery of this territory, nearly fifty-eight percent Romanian in 1945, was hailed as a major accomplishment within the formative stages of the Groza regime.

Groza continued to improve the image of his own government while strengthening the position of the Communist Party with a series of political reforms. He proceeded to eliminate any antagonistic elements in the government administration and, in the newly acquired Transylvanian territory, removed three city prefects, including that of the region's capital, Cluj. The prefects removed were immediately replaced by loyal government officials directly appointed by Groza, so as to strengthen loyalist elements in local government in the region.

Despite giving the appearance of liberal democracy by granting women's suffrage, Groza pursued a series of reforms attempting to clamp down on the prominence of politically dissident media outlets in the nation. During the first month of his premiership, Groza acted to close down Romania Nouă, a popular newspaper published by sources close to Iuliu Maniu, leader of the traditional National Peasants' Party who disagreed widely with Groza's attempted reforms. Within a month of his assumption of the premiership, Groza shut down over nine provincial newspapers and a series of periodicals which, Groza declared, were products of those, "who served Fascism and Hitlerism". Groza soon continued this repression by limiting the number of political parties allowed within the state. Although Groza had promised to purge only individuals from the government bureaucracy and diplomatic corps immediately after assuming power, in June 1947 he began to prosecute entire political organizations, as, after the Tămădău Affair, he arrested key members of the National Peasants' Party and sentenced Maniu to life in prison "for political crimes against the Romanian people". By August of that year, both the National Peasants' Party and the National Liberal Party had been dissolved and in 1948, the government coalition incorporated the Romanian Workers' Party (the forced union of communists and Romanian Social Democrats) and the Hungarian People's Union, effectively minimizing all political opposition within the state.

During his term as premier, Groza also clashed with the nation's remaining monarchist forces under King Michael I. Although his powers were minimal within Groza's regime, King Michael symbolized the remnants of the traditional Romanian monarchy and, in late 1945, the King urged Groza to resign. The King maintained that Romania must abide by the Yalta accords, allowing the United States, Great Britain, and the Soviet Union to each have a hand in post-war government reconstruction and the incorporation of a broader coalition force he had already organized. Groza flatly rejected the request, and relations between the two figures remained tense over the next few years, with Groza and the King differing on the prosecution of war criminals and in the awarding of honorary Romanian citizenship to Stalin in August 1947.

Early on the morning of 30 December 1947, Groza summoned Michael back to Bucharest, ostensibly "to discuss important matters"; the king had been preparing for a New Year's party at Peleș Castle in Sinaia. When Michael arrived, Groza presented the king with a pretyped instrument of abdication and demanded that Michael sign it. According to Michael's account, when he refused, Groza threatened to launch a bloodbath and arrest thousands of people. Michael eventually signed the document, and a few hours later parliament abolished the monarchy and declared Romania a republic.

Last years
Groza stepped down as premier in 1952, and was succeeded by Gheorghiu-Dej. He was then named president of the Presidium of the Great National Assembly (de facto president of Romania), a post he held until 1958, when he died from complications following a stomach operation. He was buried at Ghencea Cemetery; his remains were later moved to the Carol Park Mausoleum, and finally to the cemetery in his native village, Băcia.

Legacy

The mining town of Ștei in Bihor County was named Dr. Petru Groza after him, a name it kept until after the Romanian Revolution of December 1989. After his death in 1958, Transylvania Boulevard in Bucharest was renamed Dr. Petru Groza Boulevard; it is now named after Gheorghe Marinescu. There are streets named after Groza in Cluj-Napoca, Galați, and Medgidia.

A  bronze statue of Groza, placed on a red Carrara marble pedestal, was unveiled in Deva in 1962. The monument, designed by sculptor , was removed in 1990, and replaced in 1999 by a statue of Trajan; in 2007, Groza's statue was transported to Băcia. As of 2010, it lies in an open field near the Mogoșoaia Palace, next to a statue of Vladimir Lenin that used to be in front of Casa Scînteii.

References

Notes

Literature

Adrian Cioroianu (2005) Pe umerii lui Marx. O introducere în istoria comunismului românesc ("On the Shoulders of Marx. An Incursion into the History of Romanian Communism"), Editura Curtea Veche, Bucharest,  

1884 births
1958 deaths
People from Hunedoara County
Romanian Austro-Hungarians
Members of the Romanian Orthodox Church
Eastern Orthodox Christians from Romania
Eötvös Loránd University alumni
Leipzig University alumni
Austro-Hungarian military personnel of World War I
20th-century Romanian lawyers
Romanian socialists
Eastern Orthodox socialists
Romanian Christian socialists
Christian communists
People's Party (interwar Romania) politicians
Members of the Chamber of Deputies (Romania)
Romanian Ministers of Public Works
20th-century Romanian politicians
Romanian people of World War II
Heads of state of Romania
Prime Ministers of Romania
Deputy Prime Ministers of Romania
Leaders of political parties in Romania
Members of the Great National Assembly
Communism in Romania
Romanian National Party politicians
People of the Cold War